WWBW-LP (97.1 FM) was a radio station licensed to serve Higganum, Connecticut. The station was last owned by Connecticut River Educational Radio, Inc. It aired a religious radio format.

History
Connecticut River Educational Radio was one of 38 non-profit organizations that applied for an LPFM license in the initial FCC filing window that closed in September 2000. CRER was granted this low-power broadcasting license in August 2003. The station was assigned the WWBW-LP call letters by the Federal Communications Commission on April 27, 2005.

Its license was cancelled on April 4, 2022 for failing to file a renewal application.

References

External links
 

WBW-LP
WBW-LP
Defunct religious radio stations in the United States
Radio stations established in 2005
2005 establishments in Connecticut
Radio stations disestablished in 2022
2022 disestablishments in Connecticut
Defunct radio stations in the United States
WBW-LP